Blue Cadet-3, Do You Connect? is Modest Mouse's first EP release. It was released by K Records in 1994. Approximately 300 copies were originally pressed. All of the tracks on this release are available on their 2001 release Sad Sappy Sucker.

Track listing

Personnel
Isaac Brock – guitar, vocals
Jeremiah Green – drums
Dann Gallucci – guitar 
John Wickhart – bass

References

External links
Lyrics and info for this album

1994 debut EPs
Modest Mouse albums
K Records EPs